South Korea competed at the 2004 Summer Paralympics in Athens, Greece. The team included 82 athletes, 72 men and 10 women. Competitors from Korea won 28 medals, including 11 gold, 11 silver and 6 bronze to finish 16th in the medal table.

Medallists

Sports

Archery

Men

|-
|align=left|An Tae Sung
|align=left rowspan=3|Men's individual standing
|603
|10
|Bye
|W 152-143
|W 102-76
|L 92-104
|W 108-99
|
|-
|align=left|Cho Hyu Kwan
|609
|5
|Bye
|L 142-144
|colspan=4|Did not advance
|-
|align=left|Lee Hak Young
|638 WR
|1
|Bye
|L 154-155
|colspan=4|Did not advance
|-
|align=left|Jung Young Joo
|align=left rowspan=3|Men's individual W2
|619
|5
|W 159-137
|W 161-149
|W 92-87
|W 109-95
|L 95-108
|
|-

|align=left|Lee Hong Gu
|628
|1
|Bye
|W 162-152
|W 97-92
|L 95-109
|W 104-96
|
|-
|align=left|Lee Ouk Soo
|617
|7
|W 157-146
|W 146-141
|L 91-94
|colspan=3|Did not advance
|-
|align=left|Jung Young Joo Lee Hak Young Lee Hong Gu
|align=left|Men's team open
|1885 WR
|1
|colspan=2|N/A
|W 217-213
|W 236-231
|W 236-223
|
|}

Women

|-
|align=left|Ko Hee Sook
|align=left|Women's individual W1/W2
|601
|2
|N/A
|W 156-99
|W 98-92
|L 89-91
|L 99-90
|4
|-
|align=left|Lee Hwa Sook
|align=left rowspan=2|Women's individual standing
|577
|4
|N/A
|W 136-127
|L 78-88
|colspan=3|Did not advance
|-
|align=left|Lee Kyong Hee
|552
|6
|N/A
|L 126-134
|colspan=4|Did not advance
|-
|align=left|Ko Hee Sook Lee Hwa Sook Lee Kyung Hee
|align=left|Women's team open
|1730
|2
|colspan=2|N/A
|W 201-198
|L 194-205
|W 213-201
|
|}

Athletics

Men's track

Men's field

Boccia

Football 5-a-side
The men's football 5-a-side team didn't win any medals. They were 6th out of 6 teams.

Players
Bae Gwang Yong
Kim Kyoung Ho
Lee Dae Won
Lee Heung Joo
Lee Jin Won
Lee Ok Hyeong
Oh Young Kyun
Park Meong Su
Yoong Jong Suk
You Myoung Goo

Tournament

Goalball
The men's goalball team didn't win any medals. They were 8th out of 8 teams.

Players
Hong Jang Hyun
Kim Chul Hwan
Lee Sun Haeng
Lee Yoon Bong
Oh Jeong Hwan
Won Pong Pil

Tournament

Judo

Powerlifting

Men

Women

Shooting

Men

Women

Swimming

Men

Table tennis

Singles

Teams

Wheelchair fencing

Men

Wheelchair tennis

Men

Women

See also
South Korea at the Paralympics
South Korea at the 2004 Summer Olympics

References 

Nations at the 2004 Summer Paralympics
2004
Summer Paralympics